Sir Alexander Don, 6th baronet (1780–1826), of Newton Don, Berwick, was a British landowner, an officer in the British Army and a Member of Parliament (M.P.) for Roxburghshire from 1814 until 1826.

Life

Alexander was baptised on 5 May 1780. He was the oldest son of Sir Alexander Don, 5th Baronet, and Lady Harriet Cunningham, daughter of William Cunningham, 13th Earl of Glencairn.

Alexander was a captain in the Roxburgh militia in 1802,

From 1803 to 1810 he lived the high life in Verdun in France.

He served in the Berwick Yeoman Cavalry from 1810 until 1813. He served as captain in the Roxburgh Yeomanry from 1814 and was promoted to major in 1821.

On Kirkwood's map of Edinburgh dated 1817 he is marked as owner of West Coates House and a large area south of it (now an area north of Haymarket Station). In 1820 he employed Robert Smirke to rebuild his mansion at Newton Don.

He was a Catholic-sympathising Tory politician, and was elected to represent Roxburghshire on the Buccleuch interest on  25 July 1814 (at his second attempt) and represented the burgh until 11 April 1826.

He attended the Parliament erratically and made no major speeches.

He died very suddenly of a stomach complaint at Newton Don House near Kelso on 11 April 1826.

Family
Sir Alexander married first in 1809, Lucretia Montgomerie (died 1817), daughter of George Montgomerie (formerly Molineux) of Garboldisham Hall, Norfolk. She died without any surviving children.

Sir Alexander married secondly in 1824 Grace Jane (1802-1878), 22 years his junior, daughter of John Stein, a banker and distiller, of 37 Heriot Row, Edinburgh. By Grace had two children: Sir William Henry Don, 7th Baronet (b.1825), the actor; and Alexina Harriet. After his death Grace married Sir James Maxwell Wallace of Ainderby Hall near Northallerton.

On his sons departure to Australia, his estates passed to John Wauchope of Edmonstone and Niddrie, who thereafter took the name of Don-Wauchope.

References

Other Sources

External links

1780 births
1826 deaths
Baronets in the Baronetage of Nova Scotia
British Yeomanry officers
Members of the Parliament of the United Kingdom for Scottish constituencies
Scottish military personnel
UK MPs 1812–1818
UK MPs 1818–1820
UK MPs 1820–1826